Giedrė Šlekytė (born 1989) is a Lithuanian conductor, who works in Europe with a focus on opera. After she was one of three conductors for the Young Conductor Award of the Salzburg Festival in 2015, she worked at the Stadttheater Klagenfurt for two seasons. She conducted Schreker's  Die Gezeichneten at the Opernhaus Zürich, and Poulenc's Dialogues des Carmélites at the Oper Frankfurt in 2021.

Life and career 
Šlekytė was born in Vilnius, the daughter of a mathematician and a dentist. She and her sister sang in a children's choir, whose conductor recommended a school with a focus on the arts. Her ambition changed from singer to dancer, to journalist, and finally to be a conductor. She spent a semester at the Zürcher Hochschule der Künste with Johannes Schlaefli, sponsored by the Erasmus Programme. She took master classes with Riccardo Muti, Bernard Haitink, Colin Metters and Mario Venzago.

In 2013, she was awarded second prize at the Solon Michaelides conducting competition in Cyprus. She was nominated, along Lorenzo Viotti and Jiri Rozen, for the Young Conductor Award of the Salzburg Festival in 2015, and received a prize of the Malko Competition.

Conducting 
Šlekytė was Erste Kapellmeisterin at the Stadttheater Klagenfurt for two seasons beginning in 2016/17, conducting Mozart's Die Entführung aus dem Serail, Die Zauberflöte and Don Giovanni, Lehar's Das Land des Lächelns, Donizetti's Maria Stuarda, Verdi's La traviata and Tchaikovsky's Swan Lake. She conducted a performance of Opera for Children – Die Zauberflöte, a stage adaptation for children of Mozart's work, at the 2018 Salzburg Festival.

She led both the Frankfurt Radio Symphony and the Sächsische Staatskapelle Dresden for the first time in the 2018/19 season, conducting a concert at the Semperoper of works by Georges Bizet, Jukka Linkola and Mozart. She conducted Schreker's Die Gezeichneten in a new production by Barrie Kosky at the Opernhaus Zürich. She led the Gewandhausorchester in Schwanensee and Humperdinck's Hänsel und Gretel at the Oper Leipzig, Die Zauberflöte at the Theater Basel, and Pascal Dusapin's Perelà, uomo di fumo at the Staatstheater Mainz.

She also led the Orchestre de Chambre de Lausanne, the Brno Philharmonic, the Gothenburg Symphony Orchestra, the Luxembourg Philharmonic Orchestra, the Royal Stockholm Philharmonic Orchestra and the Norrköping Symphony Orchestra. She is the designated successor of Bruno Weil as Erste Gastdirigentin (first guest conductor) of the Bruckner Orchester Linz from the 2021/22 season. In July 2021, she made her debut with the Oper Frankfurt, conducting Poulenc's Dialogues des Carmélites. Due to restrictions in the COVID-19 pandemic, the orchestra had to be reduced to a chamber version, and the women's choir was positioned on the third tier. The conductor said in an interview that she was a fan of stage director Claus Guth's work already before their project together.

Awards 
 2013: Second prize Solon Michaelides conducting competition, Cypres
 2015: Nomination for the Salzburg Festival Young Conductors Award
 2015: Prize at the Malko Competition
 2018: International Opera Awards – nomination for the category Newcomer

Recordings 
 2019: Works by Raminta Šerkšnytė, Lithuanian National Symphony Orchestra with Šlekytė, Kremerata Baltica with Mirga Gražinytė-Tyla, Deutsche Grammophon

References

External links 
 
 Giedrė Šlekytė Salzburg Festival
 Giedrė Šlekytė rbartists.at (management)
 MDR Klassik-Gespräch mit Giedrė Šlekytė (in German) MDR

Lithuanian conductors (music)
Women conductors (music)
People from Vilnius
University of Music and Performing Arts Graz alumni
University of Music and Theatre Leipzig alumni
Zurich University of the Arts alumni
1989 births
Living people